Uğur Pamuk (born 26 June 1989) is an Azerbaijani international footballer who plays as a midfielder and striker for German club SC Hicret Bielefeld. He is of Turkish descent.

Career
Pamuk moved to Khazar Lenkaran from fellow Azerbaijan Premier League side Sumgayit during the 2013 winter transfer window.

On 1 July 2016, Pamuk signed a two-year contract with Manisaspor.

International career
Pamuk received his first call to the Azerbaijan national team in May 2012, when he was selected for a training camp by national coach Berti Vogts. He earned his first cap later that month against Andorra, replacing Vugar Nadyrov for the final 18 minutes of a 0–0 draw. He was added to the squad for Azerbaijan's World Cup qualifier against Northern Ireland in November 2012, but remained on the bench in the match.

Career statistics

References

External links
 

1989 births
Living people
Sportspeople from Bielefeld
Azerbaijani footballers
Azerbaijan international footballers
German footballers
German people of Turkish descent
Azerbaijani expatriate footballers
Expatriate footballers in Turkey
Azerbaijani expatriate sportspeople in Turkey
Association football midfielders
Association football forwards
Arminia Bielefeld players
Sumgayit FK players
Khazar Lankaran FK players
Manisaspor footballers
Azerbaijan Premier League players
TFF First League players
TuS Dornberg players
Footballers from North Rhine-Westphalia